Georgi Velikov Panayotov (born 1968) is a Bulgarian and was a minister in the Yanev II government Minister of Defence of Bulgaria. He is currently the Ambassador of Bulgaria to the United States since May 2022. He has held numerous posts in the Ministry of Foreign Affairs of Bulgaria and in the Ministry of Foreign Affairs department for the North Atlantic Treaty Organization. He was the Permanent Representative of the Republic of Bulgaria to the United Nations.

Biography 
Born in the Bulgarian People's Republic, Panayotov graduated from the Moscow State Institute of International Relations with a master's degree in politics. From 1995 until 2000 he was the political officer of the Bulgarian embassy in Tirana, Albania, and then the deputy head of multilateral cooperation in the southeastern European department of the foreign ministry. From 2002, Panayotov was the deputy chief of mission at the Bulgarian embassy in Kabul, Afghanistan, until 2007, and in 2010 he was appointed as political officer and deputy chief of mission at the Bulgarian embassy in Washington, DC. From 2014 until 2016 Panayotov worked as the head of NATO's foreign affairs department. Since September 2016 he has been the permanent representative of Bulgaria to the United Nations. Je was assigned by the President of Bulgaria as the acting defence minister of Bulgaria until 2021. He was appointed ambassador of Bulgaria to the United States since 2022.

Along with his native Bulgarian, is fluent in English, Russian, German, and Albanian.

References 

1968 births
21st-century Bulgarian politicians
Bulgarian diplomats
Living people
Moscow State Institute of International Relations alumni
NATO officials
Permanent Representatives of Bulgaria to the United Nations